Stenobia pradieri is a species of beetle in the family Cerambycidae, and the only species in the genus Stenobia. It was described by Jean Théodore Lacordaire in 1872.

References

Stenobiini
Beetles described in 1872